The Thunderbird Archaeological District, near Limeton, Virginia, is an archaeological district described as consisting of "three sites—Thunderbird Site, the Fifty Site, and the Fifty Bog—which provide a stratified cultural sequence spanning Paleo-Indian cultures through the end of Early Archaic times with scattered evidence of later occupation."

Thunderbird Site
This archaeological site, located in Warren County, Virginia, near modern-day Front Royal in the Shenandoah River Valley is a major site of the Paleoindian Clovis culture in Virginia. It was designated a National Historic Landmark in 1977 because it yielded dense archaeological remains as well as evidence for what is quite possibly the oldest structure in North America.  The site is one of three which make up the Thunderbird archaeological complex which consists of 2,500 acres of sites spanning the prehistoric era. The major occupations at Thunderbird site are known to date to the Late Pleistocene-Early Holocene epochs and include Clovis and later projectile points forms, as well as an array of other tools and manufacturing debris. Radiocarbon dates indicate some of the occupations date to 9900 BP (before present).

Background
Thunderbird is considered a part of the Flint Run Complex and consists of a group of sites located in and around a jasper quarry. Jasper is a mineral that is usually red and is known to break with a smooth surface. The site's relation to the quarry is important because the Paleoindians used the jasper to create tools, such as the Clovis points. It can also be used for decoration and for creating bow drills to start fires.

Thunderbird has yielded Clovis points that date between 9500 and 9000 B.C.  The inhabitants of the site are presumed to have been hunters since the tool kit found is associated with hunting wild animals. Thunderbird is a stratified site that has evidence structures found just below the plow zone along with tools, points and flakes of points. Because of its stratified deposits, Thunderbird is one of the sites used to develop a sequence of Paleo-Indian and Early Archaic assemblages in Eastern North America. Not only does the site have Clovis points, Thunderbird also has been credited with a point that is rarely found throughout the Middle Atlantic region: the Hardaway Dalton point, a point with shallow side notches and a deep basal concavity. This point averages of 60 mm in length, 35 mm across and has an average thickness of 7 mm. The microblades found at Thunderbird site are rare and linked to a few other sites, which include the Williamson Site in Dinwiddie County.  The Thunderbird site was originally located a great distance from the coast in the Late Pleistocene epoch, but it is now much closer to the coast due to rising sea levels and when occupied, seasonality would have been greater than at present.

Significant findings
It is believed that the Thunderbird site had a large population due to the vast number of artifacts discovered. This contradicts earlier views that Paleoindian peoples lived in small groupings except for the occasional large gathering for a few weeks at a time to maintain kinship networks as well as share food source knowledge.

The Thunderbird site is known for Clovis points, a projectile point that has bifacial flaking. Bifacial flaking is the knapping of a point on both sides to create a blade. These points can be found across most of North America.

See also
Clovis
List of National Historic Landmarks in Virginia
National Register of Historic Places listings in Warren County, Virginia

References

Further reading

Books
 Noel D. Justice (1987). Stone Age Spear and Arrow Points of the Midcontinental and Eastern United States. Indiana: Indiana University Press.  
David G. Anderson and Kenneth E. Sassaman (1996).  The Paleoindian and Early Archaic Southeast. Alabama: University Alabama Press. 
C. Britt Bousman and Bradley Jay Vierra (2012). From the Pleistocene to the Holocene: Human Organization and Cultural Transformations in Prehistoric North America. Texas: Texas A&M University Press. 
William M. Gardner (1974). The Flint Run Paleoindian Complex: Pattern and Process During the Paleoindian to Early Archaic. In The Flint Run Paleoindian Complex: A Preliminary Report 1971-1973 Seasons. Archaeology Laboratory, Catholic University of America.

Papers
William M. Gardner (1983). Stop me if you've Heard This One Before: The Flint Run Paleo-Indian Complex Revisited. (Archaeology of Eastern North America) 1983. p. 49-64
David J. Meltzer (1988). Late Pleistocene Human Adaptations in Eastern North America. (Journal of World Prehistory) 1988. p. 1-52
David G. Anderson and Kenneth E. Sassaman (2012). Recent Developments in Southeastern Archaeology: From Colonization to Complexity. (Society for American Archaeology. (The SAA Press) 2012.
Mary Lucas Powell (1989). Thunderbird Site Threatened. (Southeastern Archaeological Conference Newsletter Vol. 31, No. 2 University of Kentucky, Lexington KY) 1989.
Howard A. MacCord, Jr. (1975). Archaeology in Virginia: Data-Gathering is Still Fundamental and Necessary (Archaeology of Eastern North America, Vol. 3) pp. 24–30. 
Wm Jack Hranicky (2005). A Microblade Core from the Williamson Site, Dinwiddie County, Virginia. (Archaeology of Eastern North America, Vol. 33). pp. 51–56.

External links
Flint Run Archaeological District
Warren County, Virginia 
Hardaway-Dalton Points
Late-Stage Clovis Preform
Clarke Daily News: Clarke County Virginia
Honoring William M. Gardner	
Southeast
Paleo-Indians in Virginia
The Earliest Americans Theme Study
Williamson Archaeological Site

National Historic Landmarks in Virginia
Geography of Warren County, Virginia
Archaeological sites on the National Register of Historic Places in Virginia
National Register of Historic Places in Warren County, Virginia
Historic districts on the National Register of Historic Places in Virginia